Aminata Ouédraogo is a Burkinabé filmmaker and administrator. She is general coordinator of the Pan-African Union of Women in the Image Industry (UPAFI).

Life
Ouédraogo studied at the Institut Africain d'Education Cinématographique (INAFEC), a film school at the University of Ouagadougou, before studying at the Institut du Multimedia et Architecture de la Communication (IMAC) in Paris.

Ouédraogo has advised the Panafrican Film and Television Festival of Ouagadougou (FESPACO). In 1991, at the 12th FESPACO, she created the Association of African Women Professionals in Cinema, Television and Video (AFAPCTV). In 1995 the AFAPCTV was restructured as the Pan-African Union of Women in the Image Industry (UPAFI), with Ouédraogo as general coordinator. She is technical advisor to the Minister of Culture and Tourism in Burkina Faso.

Filmography
 L'impasse, 1988. Fiction.
 A qui le tour?, 1991. Documentary
 Ak Patashi (Qui m'a poussé), 1992. Documentary.
 Alcoolisme, 1992. Documentary.

References

Year of birth missing (living people)
Living people
Burkinabé film directors
21st-century Burkinabé people